Anton Giulio Majano (5 July 1909 – 12 August 1994) was an Italian screenwriter and film director. His career spanned from 1937 to 1986.

Selected filmography

Director and screenwriter
 The Eternal Chain (1952)
 Good Folk's Sunday (1953)
 The Rival (1956)
 Il padrone delle ferriere (1959)
 Atom Age Vampire (1960)
 The Corsican Brothers (1961)
 La Cittadella (TV, 1964)
 E le stelle stanno a guardare (TV, 1971)
 Marco Visconti (1975, TV series)

Screenwriter
 Hurricane in the Tropics (1939)
 Un giorno nella vita (1946)
 The White Primrose (1947)
 Un giorno nella vita (1948)
 City of Pain (1948)
 Flying Squadron (1949)
 The Beggar's Daughter (1950)
 Cavalcade of Heroes (1950)
 Strano appuntamento (1950)
 A Mother Returns (1952)
 For You I Have Sinned (1953)

References

External links

1909 births
1994 deaths
20th-century Italian screenwriters
Italian male screenwriters
Italian film directors
20th-century Italian male writers